The Große Arnspitze is the highest peak in the Arnspitze Group in the Wettersteingebirge mountains. It is located west of Scharnitz in Austria. The border between Germany and Austria runs over its summit.

The normal climbing route, Weg 851, runs from Scharnitz westwards and below the Ahrntalköpfle to the Riedberg. Below this mountain the path bends to the southwest from the Arnspitzhütte, whence it heads northwest to the summit.

References

Sources 
 Kompass Wander-, Bike und Skitourenkarte: Blatt 25 Zugspitze, Mieminger Kette (1:50.000). Kompass-Karten, Innsbruck 2008, 

Mountains of Bavaria
Two-thousanders of Austria
Mountains of the Alps
Mountains of Tyrol (state)
Two-thousanders of Germany